Treat Huey and Henri Kontinen were the defending champions, but Huey chose not to participate this year. Kontinen played alongside Dominic Inglot and successfully defended the title, defeating Andre Begemann and Leander Paes in the final, 4–6, 6–3, [12–10].

Seeds

Draw

Draw

References
 Main Draw

2016 Doubles
St. Petersburg Open - Doubles
St. Petersburg Open - Doubles